Stories Of Brothers, Tales Of Lovers is Bend Sinister's second album which was released October 21, 2008. This album could be classified as a follow-up concept album to their self-titled EP. The first single, "The Same Things" was released on September 16, 2008.The album was produced, and mixed by Vancouver's Shawn F. Cole, co-owner of FaderMaster studios.

The album takes you on a roller coaster ride through the stories of brothers and lovers; hence the album name. The album is split into two halves: first half consisting of Stories of Brothers and the second half focusing on Tales of Lovers.

Track list 

The News – 5:12
Brothers of Humankind – 3:48
The Same Things – 3:55
Jimmy Brown – 3:49
CT – 3:17
Careless – 4:20
Because Because – 4:14
Give Into The Night – 4:31
Dr. Lee – 3:59
Julianna – 3:25
Once Again – 3:46
Give Into The Night (reprise) – 1:43
Demise – 7:58
City Lights – 1:50

Personnel
 Dan Moxon – lead vocals/organ
 Naben Ruthnum – lead guitar
 Jon Bunyan – guitar/keyboards/vocals
 Jason Dana – drums
 Joel Myers – bass

References

 
 Distort Records: Bend Sinister - Stories of Brothers, Tales of Lovers

Bend Sinister (band) albums
2008 albums